On Justice is a Socratic dialogue that was once thought to be the work of Plato.  In the short dialogue, Socrates discusses with a friend questions about what is just and unjust.

This work is not to be confused with Plato's Republic, whose alternate title in ancient times was also On Justice.

References

External links 
On Justice translated by George Burges
Free public domain audiobook version of ''On Justice translated by George Burges
 . Collection includes On Justice. George Burges, translator (1855).

Dialogues of Plato
Works by Plato